Paliguana is an extinct genus of lizard-like lepidosauromorph reptile from the earliest Triassic Katberg Formation (Beaufort Group) in the upper Lystrosaurus Assemblage Zone of South Africa. It is currently the earliest known lepdosauromorph.

References 

Bringing Fossils To Life: An Introduction To Paleobiology by Donald R. Prothero

Early Triassic reptiles of Africa
Permian reptiles of Africa
Fossils of South Africa
Fossil taxa described in 1903
Prehistoric reptile genera